John Drew Sperry (February 10, 1851 – October 7, 1933) was a merchant and political figure in Nova Scotia, Canada. He represented Lunenburg County in the Nova Scotia House of Assembly from 1889 to 1896, from 1897 to 1901 and from 1902 to 1906. Sperry represented Lunenburg in the House of Commons of Canada from 1909 to 1911 as a Liberal member.

Early life and education
He was born in Petite Rivière, Nova Scotia, the son of John Charles Sperry and Mary Ann Drew, and was educated at the Sackville Academy.

Career
He served 12 years on the Lunenburg County council, also serving as county warden. Sperry was first elected to the provincial assembly in an 1889 by-election held after the death of George A. Ross. He resigned his seat in 1896 to run unsuccessfully for a federal seat. He was first elected to the House of Commons in a 1909 by-election held after Alexander Kenneth Maclean resigned his seat to serve in the provincial assembly; Sperry was defeated when he ran for reelection in 1911.

Death
He died in Petite Rivière at the age of 82.

Personal life
Sperry married Maria Dauphinee. His son Aubrey also served in the provincial assembly.

Electoral record

References 

The Canadian parliamentary companion, 1891 JA Gemmill

1851 births
1933 deaths
Nova Scotia Liberal Party MLAs
Liberal Party of Canada MPs
Members of the House of Commons of Canada from Nova Scotia